Collins is a given name, a transferred use of an English surname ultimately derived from multiple sources. It could be derived from Coll or Colin, an English diminutive of the Greek name Nicholas, or from the Irish word cuilein, meaning darling, from the Welsh collen, referring to a grove of hazel trees, or of the French Colline, meaning hill.   The name has increased in usage for girls due to a character in the 2009 movie The Blind Side.

Usage
The name has been among the 1,000 most popular names for girls since 2012 in the United States, where it was given to 998 American girls in 2021 and was the 326th most popular name given to American girls in  that year. It was among the 1,000 most popular names for boys in the United States at different points until 1915, after which it declined in use for boys. In 2021, the name was used for 47 American boys.

See also
Collins (surname)

Notes